Gerald Thomas Sievers, best known as simply Gerald Thomas (born July 1, 1954, Rio de Janeiro) is a theatre and opera director and playwright who has spent his life in the United States, England, Brazil and Germany. After graduating as a reader of philosophy at the British Museum Reading Room,  Thomas began his life in the theater at Ellen Stewart's La MaMa E.T.C. in New York City. During this period Thomas became an illustrator for the Op-Ed page of the New York Times while conducting workshops at La MaMa E.T.C. where he adapted and directed world premieres of Samuel Beckett's prose and dramatic pieces.

In the early 80s, Thomas began working with Beckett himself in Paris (after a lot of correspondence had been exchanged between them for almost two years), adapting new fiction by the author. Of these, the more notorious were All Strange Away and That Time starring the Living Theatre founder, Julian Beck in his only stage acting role outside of his own company.

In the mid-80s, Thomas became involved with German author Heiner Müller, directing his works in the US and Brazil, and began a long-term partnership with American composer Philip Glass.

In 1985 Thomas formed and established his Dry Opera Company, in São Paulo. It has performed in 15 countries up until 2008 (see list of works below).

In 2009 he wrote a manifesto declaring his "goodbye-to-theater" yet, in 2010, Thomas announced to Stage News that he was to set up his Dry Opera Company in London. Its first production, "Throats," written and directed by Thomas, began performances at the Pleasance Theater in Islington on Feb. 18, 2011.

In 2016, Thomas’s autobiography "Between Two Lines" or "Entre Duas Fileiras", is released by Grupo Editorial Record. His Art is unique upon our stages and in our lives. If you have seen or experienced it, it will remain unforgotten."

On November 11, 2017, Gerald Thomas opened his new production “Diluvio” at SESC Anchieta- Consolação, in São Paulo, Brazil, after a three-year  absence from the theater. Cast: Maria de Lima, Lisa Giobbi, Julia Wilkins, Ana Gabi, Beatrice Sayd, Isabella Lemos, André Bortolanza, Ronaldo Zero, Wagner Pinto and Dora Leão.

Works
2022
 F.E.T.O. (Fetus) opened  on July 26 2022. It is Thomas's second play  to have opened in 2022. “G.A.L.A” (a solo written for Fabiana Gugli)  opened at the Curitiba Theater Festival in March of 2022. F.E.T.O. is conceived and directed by Gerald Thomas and loosely based on “Doroteia” (1949), a play by Nelson Rodrigues, Lights are by Wagner Pinto, Music by Jørgen Teller, Ale Martins and Eduardo Agni. Cast: Lisa Giobbi, Fabiana Gugli, Rodrigo Pandolfo, Bea Sayd, Ana Gabi and Raul Barretto. Produced by Dora Leão (PlatoProduções) presented by SESC- SP.

 On March 29, 2022 Gerald Thomas’s “G.A.L.A.” live version for the stage opened the 30th anniversary Curitiba Theater Festival, Brazil with a sonorous 6 minute standing ovation. “Blog do Arcanjo” wrote: “Gerald Thomas – assumes himself as a wandering Don Quixote in these fleeting, highly digitized contemporary times. His “G.A.L.A.” starring Fabiana Gugli is a brilliant synthesis of time, so necessary in this increasingly impatient world. Gerald Thomas knows like no one else how to stage highly impactful images leading up to glorious moments of pure sensitivity and outright destruction, thus sharing with the public an incessant search for some sense.”

2021
 In 2021, a movie version of “Terra em Transito” aired throughout the months of April and May.  Gerald Thomas is strongly engaged in working within the virtual platform, given the uncertainties of the future.A historical live streamed talk with CUNY in June, made that point very clear.
 In September 2021, Thomas also world premiered his new “G.A.L.A.” (a movie/ play streamed online via SESC - SP). “G.A.L.A.” was written and performed by Fabiana Gugli.

2020
 In 2020 Gerald revisited his production from 2006, “Terra Em Transito” (Earth in Trance), which very successfully began this Covid-19 related need for live streaming theatrical works. This version was a SESC-SP production. He also took part in over 20 live streamed interviews, conferences and workshops. His lifetime achievement television came in August with the broadcasting of his life in “Persona Em Foco”, by TV Cultura, São Paulo.

2019
 In December 2019 Gerald Thomas launches a compilation of 24 of his plays staged worldwide (“Circo de Rins e Figados”) published by SESC Editions in São Paulo and in Rio. This book is partially bilingual.

2018
 On November 24, 2018, Gerald Thomas opened S.O.L.O. at the Dansekapellet in Copenhagen, Denmark. This piece was commissioned by composer Jørgen Teller and performed by Gerald himself plus partner Lisa Giobbi. It was to be a brief staged reading (a reduced  compilation from his autobiography Between Two Lines), but turned out to be a full evening of drama, comedy  and dance thanks to this partnership with Lisa. Lighting was done by Gerald’s long term lighting designer Peter Glatz (Danish).

2017
 On November 11, 2017, Gerald Thomas opened his new production “Diluvio” at SESC Anchieta- Consolação, in São Paulo, Brazil

2016
 In 2016, Thomas’s autobiography "Between Two Lines" is released by Grupo Editorial Record. The blurb on the back cover is by Oscar Nominee Fernanda Montenegro writes: "Gerald Thomas exists by virtue of his devastating quality, his inconstancy, his nonconformity, his aggressiveness, his faith laden disbelief, his life affirming death cult; His Art is unique upon our stages and in our lives. If you have seen or experienced it, it will remain unforgotten."

2014
 On April 10, 2014, Gerald Thomas premiered his "Entredentes" at SESC-Anchieta (São Paulo), featuring Ney Latorraca, Edi Botelho and Maria de Lima. According to Folha de S.Paulo, this marks the rebirth of GT as a great author and director. "Entredentes" features new music by Philip Glass and compositions by GT himself. In October of the same year, Entredentes opened at Teatro SESC Rio Ginastico, Rio de Janeiro.

2013
 Launched two books: "Scratching the Surface " (Arranhando a Superficie) - of drawings and paintings and "Citizen of the World" (Cidadão do Mundo) a biography published by Coleção Aplauso.

Sexually assaulted a reporter, Nicole Bahls, at a book signing in Leblon, south of Rio. 

2012
 Toured "Gargolios 2.0" with the London Dry Opera Company to the Curitiba International Theater Festival and did a two-week-long workshop for professional theater people at Teatro Poeira, Rio de Janeiro.

2011
 Gargólios - written and directed by Gerald Thomas for the London Dry Opera Co., Daniella Visco - movement director, actors Angus Brown, Antonia Davies, Lucy Laing, Maria de Lima, Adam Napier, and Daniel Ben Zenou. Musical score by John Paul Jones & Gerald Thomas. Presented in association with and premiered July 9, 2011 at SESC Vila Mariana, São Paulo, Brazil in English with Portuguese supertitles.
 Throats - written and directed by Gerald Thomas for the London Dry Opera Co., Daniella Visco - movement director, actors Angus Brown, Antonia Davies, Kevin Golding, Lucy Laing, Maria de Lima, Adam Napier, and Daniel Ben Zenou. The musical score includes a special piano solo by John Paul Jones. Presented in association with the Pleasance Theater, Islington, London, UK.

2008
 Bait Man - written and directed by Gerald Thomas, with Marcelo Olinto of the Cia. dos Atores, lighting & stage design by Caetano Vilela, original music & sound design by Patrick Grant, sponsored by Petrobras and SESC Rio de Janeiro - Rio de Janeiro, Brazil
 BlogNovela: "O Cão que Insultava as Mulheres, Kepler, The Dog!" - written and directed by Gerald Thomas, with: Fabiana Gugli, Pancho Capelletti, Duda Mamberti, Anna Americo, Luciana Froes, Simone Martins, Caca Manica. Lights: Caetano Vilela, Sound: Claudia Dorei, Production: Plato Productions (Dora Leão), Assistant Director: Ivan Andrade. Produced by SESC Unidade Av. Paulista and Videotaped by TV IG

2007
 Queen Liar (Rainha Mentira) - written and directed by Gerald Thomas - Brazil and Argentina
 Luartrovado (a funk opera adapted from Arnold Schoenberg's "Pierrot Lunaire") SESC Pinheiros June 2007
 Breve Interrupção performed at Satyrianas 2007, produced by Cia. de Teatro Os Satyros. Gerald Thomas ties up the critics Alberto Guzik and Sergio Coelho 

2006
 Earth in Trance (Terra em Trânsito) - written and directed by Gerald Thomas - São Paulo/Brazil and La MaMa E.T.C., NYC
 Asphalt over a Kiss (Asfaltaram o Beijo) - written and directed by Gerald Thomas - São Paulo/Brazil
 A Cube of Ice in Flames (Um Bloco de Gelo em Chamas) - written and directed by Gerald Thomas - São Paulo/Brazil
 Ashes in the Freezer (Brasas no Congelador) - written and directed by Gerald Thomas - São Paulo/Brazil
The above pieces comprise a tetralogy, produced by SESC - São Paulo with a sponsorship from Eletrobras

2005
 A Circus of Kidneys and Livers (Um Circo de Rins e Fígados) - written and directed by Gerald Thomas and starring Marco Nanini - Brazil and Argentina

2004
 Anchorpectoris - written and directed by Gerald Thomas - La MaMa E.T.C., NYC

2003
 Tristan und Isolde - opera staged by Gerald Thomas - Rio de Janeiro Opera House/Brazil - a new version, different from that of the Weimar production of 1996 which resulted in the "mooning case" after a very controversial opening.

2002
 Deus Ex-Machina - written and directed by Gerald Thomas - Brazil

2001
 Prince of Copacabana - written and directed by Gerald Thomas for Reinaldo Giannecchini - Brazil

2000
 Nietzsche Contra Wagner (SESC - São Paulo) - written and directed by Gerald Thomas - Brazil
 Waiting for Beckett - written and directed by Gerald Thomas, written for Marilia Gabriela - Brazil
 Rave Party Tragedy - written and directed by Gerald Thomas - Brazil
 "Ventriloquist 2.0 (Rio de Janeiro version) opened at Espaço Sergio Porto.

1999
 Ventriloquist - written and directed by Gerald Thomas - Brazil (four years in repertoire)
 Raw War (by Karlheinz Stockhausen and Paulo Chagas) - opera staged by Gerald Thomas - Bonn Opera House/Germany

1998
 Moses und Aron (by Arnold Schoenberg) - opera staged by Gerald Thomas - Graz Opera/Austria

1997
 Lorca on a Truck: Le Chien Andaluz (produced by SESC - São Paulo) written and directed by Gerald Thomas - Brazil (toured 32 cities)
 Babylon (by Detlef Heusinger) - libretto and direction by Gerald Thomas (commissioned by the Deutsches National Theater Mannheim and the Schwetzingen Festival) /Germany
 Graal - a Portrait of a Faust as a Young Man (by Haroldo de Campos) - directed by Gerald Thomas - Brazil
 A Brief Interruption of the End (dance piece) - written and directed by Gerald Thomas - Brazil. Article by Haroldo de Campos 
 A Brief Interruption of Hell - written and designed by Gerald Thomas
 A Hard Days' Night - written and directed by Gerald Thomas - Brazil

1996
 Chief Butterknife - written and directed by Gerald Thomas for the Danish Company Dr. Dante Aveny (they later became known as the Dogma 95 film movement)
 Nowhere Man - written and directed by Gerald Thomas - toured Brazil, Denmark and Croacia
 Tristan und Isolde (by Richard Wagner) - opera staged by Gerald Thomas - Deutsches National Theater Weimar/Germany

1995
 Don Juan (by Otavio Frias Filho) - directed by Gerald Thomas - Brazil
 Zaide (an unfinished opera by Mozart, completed by Luciano Berio) - opera directed by Gerald Thomas - opened at Maggio Musicale in Florence and toured eight European capitals
 Dr. Faust - an opera by Ferruccio Busoni, directed by Gerald Thomas - Graz Opera/Austria

1994
 Narcissus (by Beat Furrer) - a world premiere opera directed by Gerald Thomas - Graz Opera/Austria
 Unglauber (produced by SESC São Paulo) written and directed by Gerald Thomas - Brazil, Portugal and Copenhagen/Denmark
 Sorriso do Gato de Alice: Gal Costa's Show - conceived, written and directed by Gerald Thomas - Brazil and world tour 1995/96/97

1993
 Empire of Half Truths - written and directed by Gerald Thomas - Brazil, Portugal, Hamburg/Germany, Switzerland and Copenhagen/Denmark

1992
 Saints and Clowns - written and directed by Gerald Thomas - commissioned by Kampnagel's Fabrik Theatre (Hamburg) and Lausanne. It was performed back to back with The Flash and Crash Days

1991
 The Flash and Crash Days - written and directed by Gerald Thomas - toured 18 cities in Brazil, Germany, Switzerland, Denmark, Portugal, Italy and Lincoln Center/NY. It was televised by NDR 3 (German television)
 M.O.R.T.E. 2 - written and directed by Gerald Thomas - international tour included Zurich, Rome and Taormina Festival/Italy- written and directed by Gerald Thomas - international tour included Zurich, Rome and Taormina Festival/Italy

1990
 Warten auf Godot (Waiting for Godot) by Samuel Beckett - directed by Gerald Thomas - Cuvillies Thaeater - Munich State Theater/Germany
 The Said Eyes of Kalheinz Ohl written and directed by Gerald Thomas - commissioned by Pontedera and Volterra/Italy (Grotowsky's company)
 -M.O.R.T.E. (Obsessive and Redundant Movements for So Much Aesthetics) - written and directed by Gerald Thomas - Brazil
 Endgame (by Samuel Beckett) - directed by Gerald Thomas - Brazil
 Perseo and Andromeda (by Salvatore Sciarrino) - world premiere opera staged by Gerald Thomas - Stuttgart Opera House (dramaturg: Klaus Peter Kehr)

1989
 Mattogrosso (collaboration with Philip Glass) - libretto and direction by Gerald Thomas - toured Rio Opera House, São Paulo Opera House and Tokyo
 Sturmspiel - world premiere written and directed by Gerald Thomas - commissioned by the Munich State Theater (Cuvillies Theater)

1988
 Kafka Trilogy (A Process, Metamorphosis and Praga)- written and directed by Gerald Thomas - Brazil, La MaMa E.T.C., NYC and Wiener Festwochen /Vienna 1989 These pieces were broadcast by ORF (Austrian State TV) and parts of it on PBS. In the following years these pieces toured the world
 Carmen com Filtro 2.5 - written and directed by Gerald Thomas - Brazil, La MaMa/NY, Munich and Wiener Festwochen /Vienna 1989

1987
 The Flying Dutchman (by Richard Wagner) - opera staged by Gerald Thomas Rio de Janeiro Opera House/Brazil. It was broadcast live by TV Cultura in Brazil and Germany

1986
 Eletra Com Creta - written and directed by Gerald Thomas - staged at the Museum of Modern Art, Rio de Janeiro, and toured Brazil (this play establishes the birth of the Dry Opera Company)

1985
 Quartett (by Heiner Mueller) - directed by Gerald Thomas - Theater for the New City, NYC - with George Bartenieff and Crystal Field
 Quartett - Brazil with Tonia Carreiro and Sergio Britto
 Carmem Com Filtro - written and directed by Gerald Thomas - Brazil
 Beckett Trilogy (Theater 1, Theater2 and That Time) (by Samuel Beckett) - directed by Gerald Thomas - featuring Julian Beck - La MaMa E.T.C., NYC, TAT -Theater am Turm in Frankfurt and Belgrade Festival/Serbia
 Four Times Beckett (Quatro Vezes Beckett) (Theater 1, Theater 2, Nothing and That Time) (by Samuel Beckett) - directed by Gerald Thomas - Brazil

1984
 All Strange Away 1 (by Samuel Beckett) - world premiere of prose adapted and directed by Gerald Thomas - La MaMa E.T.C., NYC (actor: Ryan Cutrona)
 All Strange Away 2 (by Samuel Beckett) - directed by Gerald Thomas - The Harold Clurman Theater/NY (actor: Robert Langdon Lloyd)

References

External links
Gerald Thomas - Official Web Site
Gerald Thomas Official Blog
London Dry Opera Official web Site
Gerald Thomas Videos
Gerald Thomas' former Blog 
VIDEO: Philip GLASS on Gerald THOMAS

1954 births
Living people
Writers from Rio de Janeiro (city)
20th-century American dramatists and playwrights
American theatre directors
Brazilian male writers
American male dramatists and playwrights
Brazilian theatre directors
Brazilian people of British descent
Brazilian people of German descent
20th-century American male writers
20th-century Brazilian dramatists and playwrights